Anomie is the second full-length studio album by Swedish rock artist Tim Skold.

Track listing

2011 albums